Al-Mansour University College is a private Iraqi university established in 1988 in Baghdad, Iraq.

Faculties
Al-Mansour University College (MUC) consists of the following Departments:

 Civil Engineering Department 
 Computer Communications Engineering Department
 Computer Technology Engineering Department
 Software Engineering & Information Technology Department
 Computer Science & Information Systems Department
 Business Administration Department
 Accounting & Banking Department
 Law Department
 English Department
 [ [ Medical Instrumentation Engineering ]] Department

See also
 List of universities in Iraq

External links
 Official website

Mansour
Education in Baghdad
Educational institutions established in 1988
1988 establishments in Iraq